2003 in Ghana details events of note that happened in Ghana in the year 2003.

Incumbents
 President: John Kufuor
 Vice President: Aliu Mahama
 Chief Justice: Edward Kwame Wiredu (until 4 July), George Kingsley Acquah

Events

January

February

March
6 March - 46th independence anniversary

April

May

June

July

August

September

October

November

December
5th - National Farmers' Day celebration held in Takoradi, the capital of the Western region.
19th - President John Kufuor re-elected Chairman of the Economic Community of West African States (ECOWAS).

National holidays
Holidays in italics are "special days", while those in regular type are "regular holidays".
 January 1: New Year's Day
 March 6: Independence Day
 May 1: Labor Day
 December 25: Christmas
 December 26: Boxing Day

In addition, several other places observe local holidays, such as the foundation of their town. These are also "special days."

References